César Jayme (18 January 1918 – 8 June 1992) was a Filipino sports shooter. He competed at four Olympic Games.

References

External links
 

1918 births
1992 deaths
Filipino male sport shooters
Olympic shooters of the Philippines
Shooters at the 1948 Summer Olympics
Shooters at the 1952 Summer Olympics
Shooters at the 1956 Summer Olympics
Shooters at the 1960 Summer Olympics
Asian Games medalists in shooting
Shooters at the 1954 Asian Games
Sportspeople from Manila
Shooters at the 1958 Asian Games
Medalists at the 1954 Asian Games
Medalists at the 1958 Asian Games
Asian Games silver medalists for the Philippines
20th-century Filipino people